The 2017 Coastal Carolina Chanticleers baseball team represented Coastal Carolina University in the 2017 NCAA Division I baseball season. The Chanticleers played their home games at Springs Brooks Stadium. This was the first season of competition in the Sun Belt after transitioning from the Big South. While the Chanticleers were successful in their inaugural Sun Belt season, winning a regular season title, they failed to return to the NCAA Tournament after winning the College World Series the previous season.

Roster

Coaching staff

Schedule and results
Coastal Carolina announced its 2017 baseball schedule on November 16, 2016. The 2017 schedule consisted of 34 home and 23 away games in the regular season. The Chanticleers hosted Sun Belts foes Appalachian State, Arkansas State, Georgia Southern, Louisiana–Lafayette, and Troy and traveled to Georgia State, Louisiana–Monroe, South Alabama, Texas–Arlington, and Texas State.

The 2017 Sun Belt Conference Championship was hosted by Georgia Southern in Statesboro, Georgia. Coastal Carolina captured the regular season Sun Belt championship, but were eliminated by Texas State in the quarterfinals of the conference tournament following a 5–7 defeat. Falling to 37–19–1, the Chanticleers were not selected to participate in the NCAA Tournament.

 Rankings are based on the team's current  ranking in the Collegiate Baseball poll.

References

Coastal Carolina
Coastal Carolina Chanticleers baseball seasons